The Public Ministry of Venezuela is an organ belonging to Citizen Power, it has autonomous and independent character. It is under the direction of the Attorney General of the Republic who is elected by the National Assembly for a period of seven years.

Article 285 of the Constitution of Venezuela states that the Attorney General has the following function:

 Contribute to the establishment of criteria of the criminal politics or criminal prosecution within the State, in light of the guiding principles of modern criminal law.
 Exercise criminal action on behalf of the State.
 Guarantee respect for constitutional rights and guarantees in judicial processes.
 Ensure the speed and smooth running of the administration of justice, the prior trial and due process.
 Guarantee the treaties, conventions and international agreements signed by the Republic in criminal matters.
 Carry out the actions that may be necessary to enforce the responsibility incurred by public officials.
 Order and direct the criminal investigation of the perpetration of punishable acts.
 Protect victims and witnesses of punishable acts.
 Represent the interests of the society through the exercise of the faculties of direction of the investigation of the facts that have the characteristics of crime.

History 
As stated in the historical review of the Public Ministry, at the colonial times the role of Attorney General was exercised by an official appointed by the Monarchy of Spain, whose task was to ensure compliance with the Spanish Law in the Captaincy General of Venezuela.

After the independence processes that gave origin to the Venezuelan nation were advanced in 1819, within the framework of the origin of the republic, it was when the figure of the Attorney General was established, who was in charge of ensuring the compliance and application of the legal order. Years later, in 1830, the Constitution of the Gran Colombia, would consecrate to the Public Ministry as an organ dependent on the Executive Power, in the figure of the Attorney General of the Republic. It was not until 1901 when the Constitution of the United States of Venezuela establishes the Public Ministry, in charge of the Attorney General of the Nation, differentiating its functions from those corresponding to the Judicial Power.

Much later, in 1935, Isaías Medina Angarita enacted the Organic Law of the Public Ministry, appointing the Attorney General for its direction. Later, in 1948, the National Congress reformed said legal instrument and appointed Fernando Álvarez Manosalva as General Prosecutor. In 1953, with the arrival of the dictator Marcos Pérez Jiménez to power, the functions of the Public Prosecutor's Office are again assigned to the Procurator's Office. However, after the overthrow of Perez, in 1961 the Constitution of the Republic of Venezuela would establish the Public Ministry as an autonomous institution and independent of the other powers, under the responsibility of the Attorney General of the Republic.

In the Fifth Republic, with the entry into force of the Constitution of the Bolivarian Republic of Venezuela (Constitution), the Citizen Power is created, which is currently exercised by the Republican Moral Council, composed of the Attorney General of the Republic, the Ombudsman and the Comptroller General of the Republic, and, at the same time, their autonomy is established.

Prosecutors General of the Republic

Controversy 
In 2017, the Supreme Court of Justice, at the request of Pedro Carreño, initiated legal proceedings that culminated in the dismissal of Luisa Ortega Díaz as attorney general, a procedure that constitutionally can only be carried out by the National Assembly. On August 5, 2017, the National Constituent Assembly promoted by Nicolás Maduro, appointed Tarek William Saab as head of the Public Ministry. Ortega Díaz disregarded the sentence of the Supreme Court of Justice on her dismissal and ignored the designation of Saab as attorney general, and several deputies of the National Assembly expressed their support for the affected official. Luis Almagro, General Secretary of the Organization of American States (OAS), and several leaders and prosecutors of the world expressed their rejection and repudiation of the dismissal of Luisa Ortega Díaz.

Anthem of the Public Ministry 
Lyrics: Nery Carballo
Music: Michel Eustache

See also 
 Politics of Venezuela

References

External links 
 Official website of the Public Ministry (in Spanish)

 
Politics of Venezuela
Political organizations based in Venezuela
Law of Venezuela
Organizations based in Caracas